Shadows on the Stairs is a 1941 American mystery film directed by D. Ross Lederman.

It is based on Frank Vosper's play Murder on the Second Floor. The British subsidiary of Warner Brothers had previously produced a film adaptation of the work in 1932.

Premise
Residents of a London boarding house come under suspicion during a string of murders.

Cast
 Frieda Inescort as Mrs. Stella Rosabelle Armitage
 Paul Cavanagh as Joseph "Joe" Reynolds
 Heather Angel as Sylvia Armitage
 Bruce Lester as Hugh Bromilow
 Miles Mander as Tom Armitage
 Lumsden Hare as Inspector Gregg
 Turhan Bey as Ram Singh
 Charles Irwin as Constable
 Phyllis Barry as Lucy Timson, the Maid
 Mary Field as Phoebe Martia St. John Snell
 Paul Renay as Choong Thi, Hindu Sailor
 Sidney Bracey as Watchman (scenes deleted)

Soundtrack
 Charles Irwin - "Comin' Thro' the Rye" (Music Traditional, words by Robert Burns)

References

External links
 
 
 
 

1941 films
1941 romantic drama films
American mystery films
1940s English-language films
American black-and-white films
American films based on plays
Warner Bros. films
American romantic drama films
Films directed by D. Ross Lederman
Films set in London
1941 mystery films
1940s American films
Films scored by Bernhard Kaun